Denis Ryan may refer to:

 Denis Ryan (footballer) (1916–1980), Australian rules footballer
 Denis Ryan (singer), Irish-Canadian folk musician
 Dinny Ryan (hurler) (1927–2009), Irish hurler for Tipperary